Heterdaad was a Belgian television series involving the activities of BOB, the former Belgian security and search brigade which was part of the gendarmerie. It was aired on Eén between 1996 and 1999. It was the intention to produce 5 seasons but as the BOB was dismantled season 5 was never made. The series and characters were created by Ward Hulselmans.

Main cast

Episodes

External links
 
 "Heterdaad season 1" on DVD info
 "Heterdaad season 3" on DVD Info
 "Heterdaad season 2" on DVD info

References

Belgian drama television shows
Belgian crime television series
Eén original programming